Gaari may refer to:
 Gaari people, an indigenous Australian people
 Gaari language, an Australian language

See also 
 Juriën Gaari (born 1993), footballer

Language and nationality disambiguation pages